Ghislaine Noelle Marion Maxwell (born 25 December 1961) is a British convicted sex offender and former socialite. In 2021, she was found guilty of child sex trafficking and other offences in connection with the financier and convicted sex offender Jeffrey Epstein. In June 2022, she was sentenced in a New York court to 20 years imprisonment.

Born in France, Maxwell was raised in Oxford. In the 1980s she attended Balliol College, Oxford, and then became a prominent member of London's social scene. Maxwell worked for her father, Robert Maxwell, until his death in 1991; she then moved to New York City, where she continued living as a socialite and had a relationship with Epstein. In 2012, Maxwell founded a non-profit group for the protection of oceans. Following sex trafficking allegations being brought by prosecutors against Epstein in July 2019, the organisation announced cessation of operations the same month. Maxwell is a naturalised US citizen and retains both French and British citizenship.

In July 2020, Maxwell was arrested and charged by the federal government of the United States with the crimes of enticement of minors and sex trafficking of underage girls, related to her association with Epstein. She was denied bail as a flight risk, with the judge expressing concerns regarding her "completely opaque" finances, her skill at living in hiding, and the fact that France does not extradite its citizens. In December 2021, she was convicted on five out of six counts, including one of sex trafficking of a minor. She faces a second criminal trial for two charges of lying under oath about Epstein's abuse of underage girls.

Early life 

Maxwell was born in 1961, in Maisons-Laffitte, Yvelines, France, the ninth and youngest child of Elisabeth (née Meynard), a French-born scholar, and Robert Maxwell, a Czechoslovak-born British media proprietor. Her father was from a Jewish family, and her mother was of Huguenot (French Protestant) descent. Maxwell was born two days before a car accident that left her fifteen-year-old brother Michael in a prolonged coma until his death in 1967. Her mother later reflected that the accident had an effect on the entire family, and surmised that Ghislaine had shown signs of anorexia while still a toddler. Throughout childhood, Maxwell lived with her family in Oxford at Headington Hill Hall, a 53-room mansion, where the offices of Pergamon Press, a publishing company run by Robert Maxwell, were also located. Her mother said that all her children were brought up as Anglicans. She studied first at Oxford High School for Girls in North Oxford and then, aged nine, was enrolled at Edgarley Hall boarding preparatory school in Somerset, followed by Headington School at age thirteen. Maxwell attended Marlborough College to study for A-Levels, before going on to earn a degree in Modern History with Languages from Balliol College, Oxford in 1985.

Maxwell had a close relationship with her father and was reportedly his favourite. According to Tatler, Maxwell recalled that her father installed computers at Headington in 1973 and her first job was training to use a Wang 2200 and later programming code. The Times reported that he did not permit Maxwell to bring her boyfriends home or to be seen with them publicly, after she started attending Oxford University.

Career 

Maxwell was a prominent member of the London social scene in the 1980s. She founded a women's club named after the original Kit-Cat Club and was a director of Oxford United Football Club during her father's ownership. She also worked at The European, a publication Robert Maxwell had established. According to Tom Bower, writing for The Sunday Times, in 1986 Robert Maxwell invited her to the naming in her honour of his new yacht the Lady Ghislaine, at a shipyard in the Netherlands. Maxwell spent a large amount of time in the late 1980s aboard the yacht, which was equipped with a Jacuzzi, sauna, gym and disco. The Scotsman said Robert Maxwell had also "tailor-made a New York company for her". The company, which dealt in corporate gifts, was not profitable.

The Sunday Times reported that Maxwell flew to New York on 5November 1990 to deliver an envelope on her father's behalf that, unknown to her, was part of "a plot initiated by her father to steal $200m" from Berlitz shareholders.
 
After Robert Maxwell purchased the New York Daily News in January 1991, he sent Maxwell to New York City to act as his emissary. In May 1991, Maxwell and her father took Concorde on business to New York, from where he soon departed for Moscow and left her to represent his interests at an event honouring Simon Wiesenthal.

In November 1991, Robert Maxwell's body was found floating in the sea near the Canary Islands and the Lady Ghislaine. Soon afterwards, Maxwell flew to Tenerife, where the yacht was berthed, to attend to his business paperwork. Maxwell attended her father's funeral in Jerusalem alongside Israeli intelligence figures, president Chaim Herzog, and prime minister Yitzhak Shamir, who gave his eulogy. Although a verdict of death by accidental drowning was recorded, Maxwell has since said she believes her father was murdered, commenting in 1997: "He did not commit suicide. That was just not consistent with his character. I think he was murdered." After his death, Robert Maxwell was found to have fraudulently appropriated the pension assets of Mirror Group Newspapers, a company that he ran and in which he held a large share of ownership, to support its share price. Pension funds in excess of £400m were said to be missing, and 32,000 people were affected. Two of Maxwell's brothers, Ian and Kevin, who were the most involved with their father in daily business dealings, were arrested on 19 June 1992 and charged with fraud related to the Mirror Group pension scandal. The brothers were acquitted three and a half years later in January 1996.

Maxwell moved to the United States in 1991, shortly after her father's death. Maxwell was provided with an annual income of £80,000 from a trust fund established in Liechtenstein by her father. By 1992, she had moved to an apartment of an Iranian friend overlooking Central Park. At the time, Maxwell worked at a real estate office on Madison Avenue and was reported to be socialising with celebrities. She quickly rose to wider prominence as a New York City socialite.

Relationship with Jeffrey Epstein 

Accounts differ on when Maxwell first met American financier Jeffrey Epstein. According to Epstein's former business partner, Steven Hoffenberg, Robert Maxwell introduced his daughter to Epstein in the late 1980s. The Times reported that Maxwell met Epstein in the early 1990s at a New York party following "a difficult break-up with Count Gianfranco Cicogna Mozzoni" (1962–2012) of the CIGA Hotels clan.

Maxwell had a romantic relationship with Epstein for several years in the early 1990s and remained closely associated with him for more than 25 years until his death in 2019. The nature of their relationship remains unclear. In a 2009 deposition, several of Epstein's household employees testified that Epstein referred to her as his "main girlfriend" who also hired, fired, and supervised his staff, starting around 1992. She has also been referred to as the "Lady of the House" by Epstein's staff and as his "aggressive assistant". In a 2003 Vanity Fair profile on Epstein, author Vicky Ward said Epstein referred to Maxwell as "my best friend". Ward also observed that Maxwell seemed "to organize much of his life".

Politico reported that Maxwell and Epstein had friendships with several prominent individuals in elite circles of politics, academia, business and law, including former Presidents Donald Trump and Bill Clinton, attorney Alan Dershowitz, and Prince Andrew, Duke of York.

Maxwell is known for her longstanding friendship with Prince Andrew, and for having escorted him to a "hookers and pimps" social function in New York. In a November 2019 interview with the BBC, Andrew said that the two had known each other since Maxwell was an undergraduate at Oxford. She introduced Epstein to Prince Andrew, and the three often socialised together. In 2000, Maxwell and Epstein attended a party thrown by Prince Andrew at the Queen's Sandringham House estate in Norfolk, England, reportedly for Maxwell's 39th birthday. In his November 2019 interview with the BBC, Prince Andrew confirmed that Maxwell and Epstein had attended an event at his invitation, but he denied that it was anything more than a "straightforward shooting weekend".

In 1995, Epstein renamed one of his companies the Ghislaine Corporation; based in Palm Beach, Florida, the company was dissolved in 1998. As a trained helicopter pilot, Maxwell also transported Epstein to his private Caribbean island.

In 2008, Epstein was convicted of soliciting a minor for prostitution and served 13 months of an 18-month jail sentence. Following Epstein's release, although Maxwell continued to attend prominent social functions, she and Epstein were no longer seen together publicly.

By late 2015, Maxwell had largely retreated from attending social functions.

Civil cases and accusations

Civil suits

Virginia Giuffre v Maxwell (2015) 
Details of a civil lawsuit, made public in January 2015, contained a deposition from "Jane Doe3" that accused Maxwell of recruiting her in 1999, when she was a minor, and grooming her to provide sexual services for Epstein. A 2018 exposé by Julie K. Brown in the Miami Herald revealed Jane Doe3 to be Virginia Giuffre, who was previously known as Virginia Roberts. Giuffre met Maxwell at Donald Trump's Mar-a-Lago Club in Palm Beach, Florida, when Giuffre was a 16-year-old spa attendant. She asserted that Maxwell had introduced her to Epstein, after which she was "groomed by the two [of them] for his pleasure, including lessons in Epstein's preferences during oral sex".

Maxwell has repeatedly denied any involvement in Epstein's crimes. In a 2015 statement, Maxwell rejected allegations that she has acted as a procurer for Epstein and denied that she had "facilitated Prince Andrew's [alleged] acts of sexual abuse". Her spokesperson said "the allegations made against Ghislaine Maxwell are untrue" and she "strongly denies allegations of an unsavoury nature, which have appeared in the British press and elsewhere, and reserves her right to seek redress at the repetition of such old defamatory claims".

Giuffre asserted that Maxwell and Epstein had trafficked her and other underage girls, often at sex parties hosted by Epstein at his homes in New York, New Mexico, Palm Beach, and the United States Virgin Islands. Maxwell called her a liar. Giuffre sued Maxwell for defamation in federal court in the Southern District of New York in 2015. While details of the settlement have not been made public, in May 2017 the case was settled in Giuffre's favour, with Maxwell paying Giuffre "millions".

Sarah Ransome v Epstein and Maxwell (2017) 
In 2017, Sarah Ransome filed a suit, in the United States District Court for the Southern District of New York, against Epstein and Maxwell, alleging that Maxwell hired her to give massages to Epstein and later threatened to physically harm her or destroy her career prospects if she did not comply with their sexual demands at his mansion in New York and on his private Caribbean island of Little Saint James, in the United States Virgin Islands. The suit was settled in 2018 under undisclosed terms.

Affidavit filed by Maria Farmer (2019) 
On 16 April 2019, Maria Farmer went public and filed a sworn affidavit in federal court in New York, alleging that she and her 15-year-old sister, Annie, had been sexually assaulted by Epstein and Maxwell in separate locations in 1996. Farmer's affidavit was filed in support of a defamation suit by Virginia Giuffre against Alan Dershowitz. According to the affidavit, Farmer had met Maxwell and Epstein at a New York art gallery reception in 1995. The affidavit says that in the summer of the following year, they hired her to work on an art project in billionaire businessman Leslie Wexner's Ohio mansion, where she was then sexually assaulted by both Maxwell and Epstein. Farmer reported the incident to the New York Police Department and the FBI. Her affidavit also stated that during the same summer, Epstein flew her then 15-year-old sister, Annie, to his New Mexico property where he and Maxwell molested her on a massage table.

Farmer was interviewed for CBS This Morning in November 2019 where she detailed the 1996 assault and alleged that Maxwell had threatened both her career and her life after the assault.

Jennifer Araoz v Epstein's estate, Maxwell, and Jane Does 1–3 (2019) 
On 14 August 2019, Jennifer Araoz filed a lawsuit in New York County Supreme Court against Epstein's estate, Maxwell, and three unnamed members of his staff; the lawsuit was made possible under New York state's new Child Victims Act, which took effect on the same date. Araoz later amended her complaint on 8 October 2019 with the names of the previously unidentified women enablers to include Lesley Groff, Cimberly Espinosa, and the late Rosalyn Fontanilla.

Priscilla Doe v Epstein's estate (2019) 
Ghislaine Maxwell was named in one of three lawsuits filed in New York on 20 August 2019 against the estate of Jeffrey Epstein. The woman filing the suit, identified as "Priscilla Doe", claimed that she was recruited in 2006 and trained by Maxwell with step-by-step instructions on how to provide sexual services for Epstein.

Annie Farmer v Maxwell and Epstein's Estate (2019) 
Annie Farmer, represented by David Boies, sued Maxwell and Epstein's estate in Federal District Court in Manhattan in November 2019, accusing them of rape, battery and false imprisonment and seeking unspecified damages.

Jane Doe v Maxwell and Epstein's Estate (2020) 
In January 2020, a lawsuit was filed against Maxwell and Epstein alleging that they recruited a 13-year-old music student at the Interlochen Center for the Arts in the summer of 1994 and subjected her to sexual abuse. The suit states that Jane Doe was repeatedly sexually assaulted by Epstein over a four-year period and that Maxwell played a key role both in her recruitment and by participating in the assaults. According to the lawsuit, Jane Doe was targeted by Epstein and Maxwell for being fatherless and from a struggling family, in much the same manner as many of the other alleged victims.

Maxwell v Epstein's Estate, Darren K. Indyke, Richard D. Kahn, and NES LLC (2020) 
On 12 March 2020, Maxwell filed a lawsuit in Superior Court in the US Virgin Islands seeking compensation from Epstein's estate for her legal costs. Maxwell claimed she had been a longtime employee of Epstein (from 1998 to 2006) who had served to manage his property holdings in the US Virgin Islands, New York, New Mexico, Florida and Paris while continuing to deny any knowledge or involvement in his criminal activities. According to the lawsuit, Maxwell was seeking damages for the legal fees associated with defending herself against her accusers, expenses that she claims Epstein had promised to cover for her.

Jane Doe v Epstein's estate (2021) 
Maxwell was named in a civil suit filed against Epstein's estate in March 2021 by a Broward County woman who accused Epstein and Maxwell of trafficking her after repeatedly raping her in Florida in 2008.

Dispute over release of court documents 
On 2 July 2019, the US Court of Appeals for the Second Circuit ordered the unsealing of documents from the earlier civil suit against Maxwell by Virginia Giuffre. Jeffrey Epstein was arrested on 6 July 2019 at Teterboro Airport in New Jersey and charged with sex trafficking and sex trafficking conspiracy.

Maxwell requested a rehearing in a federal appeals court on 17 July 2019, in an effort to keep documents sealed that were part of a suit by Giuffre. On 9 August 2019, the first batch of documents was unsealed and released from the earlier defamation suit by Giuffre against Maxwell. Epstein was found dead on 10 August 2019, after reportedly hanging himself in his Manhattan prison cell.

Maxwell and her lawyers continued to argue against the further release of court documents in December 2019. Reuters confirmed on 27 December 2019 that Maxwell was under investigation by the FBI for facilitating Epstein's criminal activities.

Additional documents from the Giuffre v Maxwell defamation suit were released on 30 July 2020. The documents included a deposition given by Giuffre and more recent email exchanges between Maxwell and Epstein, with some of the correspondence from 2015.

Attempts to locate Maxwell to serve court documents 
On 27 December 2019, Reuters reported that Maxwell was among those under FBI investigation for facilitating Epstein. After his arrest, Maxwell was in hiding, communicating with the courts only through her lawyers who, as of 30 January 2020, had refused to accept on her behalf service of three lawsuits against her. The New York Times reported that by 2016, Maxwell was no longer being photographed at events. By 2017, her lawyers claimed before a judge that they did not know her address; they further stated that she was in London but they did not believe she had a permanent residence.

Maxwell has a history of being unreachable during legal proceedings. During the lawsuit filed in 2017 from Ransome against Maxwell, District Judge John G. Koeltl granted a motion for "alternative service" on the grounds that the plaintiff's efforts to reach Maxwell were persistently thwarted; these included hiring a private investigation firm that attempted service at three physical addresses, sending information to several email addresses, and reaching out to the lawyers actively representing Maxwell in another lawsuit who refused to become a "general agent of process" to relay the information to her.

According to court documents from a lawsuit filed by Epstein against Bradley Edwards (a representative for several of his accusers), in 2010 Maxwell had agreed to provide a deposition in the case but reportedly left the country one day before Edwards was scheduled to fly to New York to take her deposition, "claiming she needed to return to the United Kingdom to be with her deathly ill mother" with no intention of returning to the United States. However, Maxwell returned within a month to attend Chelsea Clinton's wedding.

In January 2020, it was reported that Maxwell had refused to allow her lawyers to be served with several lawsuits in which she has been directly named in 2019 and 2020, including one by Farmer and from Araoz. While Maxwell's lawyers continued to argue on her behalf against the release of additional court documents from the Giuffre v Maxwell lawsuit, they claimed to not know where she was or to have permission to accept the lawsuits filed against her.

Authorities in the United States Virgin Islands (USVI) were unsuccessful in locating Maxwell during the three and a half months they were seeking to serve her with a subpoena. USVI prosecutors consider Maxwell to be a "critical fact witness" in their lawsuit against Epstein's estate. A court filing from the USVI Department of Justice, released on 10 July 2020, stated that Maxwell was also under investigation for her alleged participation in Epstein's sex trafficking operation in the US Virgin Islands.

Criminal charges

Arrest and indictment 
Maxwell faced persistent allegations of procuring and sexually trafficking underage girls for Epstein and others, charges she denied. Maxwell was arrested in Bradford, New Hampshire by the FBI on 2 July 2020, through the use of an IMSI-catcher ("stingray") mobile phone tracking device on a phone used by her to call one of her lawyers, her husband Scott Borgerson, and her sister Isabel.

Prosecutors, led by United States District Attorney Audrey Strauss, charged Maxwell with six federal crimes, including enticement of minors, sex trafficking of children, and perjury. The indictment charged that between 1994 and 1997, she "assisted, facilitated, and contributed" to the abuse of minor girls despite knowing that one of three unnamed victims was 14 years old.

, Maxwell was held at the Metropolitan Detention Center, Brooklyn, New York. Lawyers requested that Judge Nathan release her on $5 million bond with monitored home confinement while awaiting trial. Maxwell appeared by video link before a court in Manhattan on 14 July 2020 and pleaded not guilty to the charges. A naturalised US citizen since 2002 who also holds passports from France and the United Kingdom, Maxwell was denied bail as a flight risk amid concerns regarding her "completely opaque" finances, her skill at living in hiding, and the fact that France does not extradite its citizens. The judge set a trial date of 12 July 2021.

Maxwell's attorney reiterated her request for bail on 18 December 2020, and proposed that Maxwell reside with a friend in New York City while under 24-hour surveillance as she awaited trial. Her husband, Scott Borgerson, made a secured offer of US$22 million to guarantee her presence at future appearances. On 28 December 2020, a further request for bail was again rejected by the judge. Maxwell's bail request was opposed by alleged victim Annie Farmer.

On 19 January 2021, a court hearing was disrupted by believers in QAnon – who believe Maxwell to be working in cohort with a cabal of child-sacrificing Satanist liberal elites who traffic children for sex – as the proceedings were illegally livestreamed to YouTube.

On 26 January 2021, a motion by Maxwell's attorneys challenged her grand jury indictment, claiming that it did not reflect the ethnic diversity of the jurisdiction in which the violations of the law were alleged to have occurred.

On 29 March 2021, US prosecutors added new charges of sex trafficking a minor and sex trafficking conspiracy, alleging that Maxwell was involved in grooming a fourth girl, aged 14, to engage in sexual acts with Epstein between 2001 and 2004 at his residence in Palm Beach. Maxwell pleaded not guilty to the additional charges; she faced six counts that included sex trafficking of a minor and sex trafficking conspiracy, in addition to two counts of perjury.

Maxwell's attorneys regularly protested about the conditions of her confinement, which included being kept awake by a light shone in her eyes every fifteen minutes to deter the chances of her committing suicide, and being denied a sleep mask. One, David Marcus, protested, "There's no evidence she's suicidal. They're doing it because Jeffrey Epstein died on their watch", and that, "She's not Jeffrey Epstein, this isn't right".

Sex-trafficking trial
In April 2021, US District Judge Alison Nathan ruled that Maxwell would face two separate trials, one for the sex trafficking charges and another for perjury. Nathan delayed the first trial to 29 November 2021 after Maxwell's defence lawyers successfully argued that the new charges added in March 2021 did not give them enough time to prepare for trial. Maxwell appeared in court on 15 November 2021. The trial commenced on 29 November with opening statements. Twelve jurors had been picked, plus six alternates, from a pool of forty to sixty people.

Psychology professor Elizabeth Loftus was called as an expert witness for the defence and provided testimony on false memory syndrome. 

Maxwell chose not to testify, telling the judge "Your honour, the government has not proved its case beyond a reasonable doubt. So there is no need for me to testify." A spokesperson for Maxwell's family had previously said she was "too fragile" to testify.

In early December 2021, Twitter suspended the account “@TrackerTrial”, an account monitoring Maxwell's trial. The account was two weeks old and had 525,000 followers before its suspension.

On 28 December, as the jury completed its fourth full day of deliberations, judge Nathan said she feared jurors and trial participants might become infected with COVID-19 and forced to quarantine, raising the possibility of a mistrial. She later said that she had extended the jury's hours to 6 pm and would also have deliberations continue through the holiday weekend until the jury reached a verdict.

Conviction

On 29 December 2021, Maxwell was found guilty and convicted by a jury in US federal court on five sex trafficking-related counts carrying a potential custodial sentence of up to 65 years' imprisonment: one of sex trafficking of a minor (maximum: 40 years), one of transporting a minor with the intent to engage in criminal sexual activity (10 years) and three of conspiracy to commit choate felonies (15 years total).

Maxwell was acquitted on the charge of enticing a minor to travel to engage in illegal sex acts. Maxwell's family said the appeal process had begun.

The only witness to use her real name during her testimony, Annie Farmer, spoke out after the trial saying, "I hope that this verdict brings solace to all who need it... Even those with great power and privilege will be held accountable when they sexually abuse and exploit the young."

A retrial was sought on the grounds that a juror did not disclose during jury selection that he had been sexually abused as a child. He had shared a narrative of that abuse with other jurors during the proceedings. On 1 April 2022, the judge found that the juror's failure to disclose his abuse as a child did not warrant a new trial and dismissed Maxwell's request to set aside the verdict. 

On 28 June 2022, Maxwell was sentenced to 20 years in prison; prosecutors were seeking a sentence of at least 30 years. She complained of threats coming from jail staff in the days prior to sentencing, but gave no details about the nature of the threats. Although she had been placed on suicide watch on 24 June, she told the psychiatric team that she was not suicidal. A related request by her lawyers for a sentencing delay was denied. She appealed the conviction on 7 July. On 25 July 2022, Maxwell was transferred from Metropolitan Detention Center, Brooklyn to a low security federal prison for female inmates at FCI Tallahassee. In August 2022, her former lawyers sued Maxwell, alleging that she failed to pay $878,000 in legal fees.

Perjury trial
Maxwell faces a second criminal trial for perjury on two charges that she lied under oath during a civil suit in 2015 about Epstein's abuse of underage girls. Each count carries a maximum sentence of five years in prison. Prosecutors have said that perjury charges will be dropped if she is sentenced on schedule. Following a petition for a new trial, submitted under seal, prosecutors told the judge on 4 February that Maxwell's arguments for a retrial must be "publicly docketed"; the judge said that the reasons for making the submission under seal must be made public.

TerraMar Project 
In 2012, Maxwell founded the TerraMar Project, a nonprofit organisation that advocated the protection of oceans. She gave a lecture for TerraMar at the University of Texas at Dallas and a TED talk, at TEDx Charlottesville in 2014. Maxwell accompanied Stuart Beck, a 2013 TerraMar board member, to two United Nations meetings to discuss the project.

The TerraMar Project announced its closure on 12 July 2019, less than a week after the charges of sex trafficking brought by New York federal prosecutors against Epstein became public. An associated, UK-based company, Terramar (UK), listed Maxwell as a director. An application for the United Kingdom organisation to be closed was made on 4 September 2019, with the first notice in The London Gazette made on 17 September 2019. The company Terramar (UK) was listed as officially dissolved on 3 December 2019.

Personal life 
Since at least 1997, Maxwell has maintained a residence in Belgravia, London. In 2000, Maxwell moved into a  townhouse on East 65th Street, New York City, fewer than 10 blocks from Epstein's mansion. Maxwell's townhouse was purchased for US$4.95 million by an anonymous limited liability company, with an address that matches the office of J. Epstein & Co. Representing the buyer was Darren Indyke, Epstein's longtime lawyer. In April 2016, the property was sold for US$15 million.

Following her personal and professional involvement with Epstein, Maxwell was romantically linked for several years to Ted Waitt, founder of Gateway Computers. She attended the wedding of Chelsea Clinton in 2010 as Waitt's guest. Maxwell helped Waitt obtain and renovate a luxury yacht, the Plan B, and used it for travel to France and Croatia before their relationship ended, in late 2010 or early 2011.

On 15 August 2019, reports surfaced that Maxwell had been living in Manchester-by-the-Sea, Massachusetts, in the home of Scott G. Borgerson, a Council on Foreign Relations fellow in residence, since 2007, who, in October 2020, due to the publicity surrounding Maxwell, stepped down as CEO of CargoMetrics, a hedge fund he had founded. Maxwell and Borgerson were described as having been in a romantic relationship for several years. Locals in the town of Manchester-by-the-Sea said Maxwell had kept a low profile, went by "G" instead of her full first name, and had been seen on several occasions walking a Vizsla dog along the beach.

Borgerson and Maxwell filed documents in Massachusetts Land Court about Borgerson's residence, known as Phippin House, during a civil dispute with neighbours regarding rescinded access rights to the larger Sharksmouth Estate in 2019. A neighbouring property manager attested that Maxwell and Borgerson were living together at the property in question. Others have said they had been seen repeatedly running together in the mornings.

Borgerson stated in August 2019 that Maxwell was not currently living at the home and that he did not know where she was. On 15 August 2019, the New York Post published photographs of Maxwell dining at a fast-food restaurant in Los Angeles, claiming that "The Post found the socialite hiding in plain sight in the least likely place imaginable — a fast-food joint in Los Angeles". The photos were later proven to have been taken at a meeting with Maxwell's friend and attorney Leah Saffian, who also gave other pictures to the Daily Mail.

Maxwell moved to a remote  property in Bradford, New Hampshire in late 2019, where she used former British military personnel as personal security until her arrest in July 2020. At the time of her arraignment, federal prosecutors stated that Maxwell was married; she did not disclose the identity of her spouse, or their respective finances. In December 2020, it emerged that she had married Borgerson in 2016.

References

External links 

 Bureau of Prisons Inmate Locator — GHISLAINE NOELLE MAXWELL Register Number: 02879-509
 Right Hand Woman 27:21 video, 60 Minutes, Australia, 2020
 Exposing Jeffrey Epstein's international sex trafficking ring, 45:16 video, 60 Minutes, Australia, 2019
 Unsealed Court Documents from Giuffre vs. Maxwell released 2019 (74 pages)
 United States Court of Appeals for the Second Circuit from Brown v. Maxwell; Dershowitz v. Giuffre released 2019

 
1961 births
20th-century American businesspeople
20th-century English businesspeople
21st-century American criminals
21st-century English criminals
21st-century French criminals
Alumni of Balliol College, Oxford
American female criminals
American people convicted of child sexual abuse
American people of French descent
American people of Slovak-Jewish descent
American prisoners and detainees
American socialites
British people convicted of child sexual abuse
British people of Slovak-Jewish descent
English expatriates in the United States
English female criminals
English people of French descent
English people of Jewish descent
English prisoners and detainees
English socialites
French expatriates in the United States
French people convicted of child sexual abuse
French people of Jewish descent
French people of Slovak descent
French prisoners and detainees
French female criminals
French socialites
Helicopter pilots
Jeffrey Epstein
Living people
Maxwell family
Naturalized citizens of the United States
Oxford United F.C. non-playing staff
People charged with perjury
People convicted of sex trafficking
People educated at Headington School
People educated at Marlborough College
People educated at Millfield Preparatory School
People educated at Oxford High School, England
People from Maisons-Laffitte
Prisoners and detainees of the United States federal government
Bill Clinton controversies
Donald Trump controversies
Prince Andrew, Duke of York